

Events calendar

+09